Bisha, also known as Qal`at Bishah, is a town in the south-western Saudi Arabian province, 'Asir. Bisha was its own province before merging with its neighboring province, 'Asir. Bisha has a population of 205,346 according to the 2010 Census, with nearly 240 villages and 58 larger settlements that are spread out on both sides of the Bisha Valley (the longest valley in the Arabian Peninsula). The city is located to the south of the Arabian Peninsula, which is almost entirely under the administration of the Kingdom of Saudi Arabia. It stands at an altitude of approximately 610 meters (2,000 ft.) above sea level.

Agriculture

The Bisha area is of immense agricultural importance due to high soil fertility, abundant water, and palm cultivation. There are around 3,000,000 palm trees, among other trees of multiple varieties, and their fruits are sold widely to cities in the vicinity.

Ibn Saud then set out to conquer the surrounding region with the goal of bringing it under the rule of a single Islamic state. Ibn Dawwas of Riyadh led the most determined resistance, allied with forces from Al Kharj, Al Ahsa, and the Banu Yam clan of Najran. However, Ibn Dawwas fled and Riyadh capitulated to the Saudis in 1774, ending long years of wars, and leading to the declaration of the first Saudi State, with Riyadh as its capital.

The government of Saudi Arabia's strategic plan involves using a newly constructed dam to supply water to population centers rather than to irrigate farms. The Ministry of Agriculture and Water was concerned about the Bisha area's dependence on groundwater and initially decided to construct a dam in the Bisha Valley (King Fahad Dam) to support agricultural activities in the region. However, due to the scarcity of clean drinking water, the dam output has been redirected for drinking purposes, resulting in a sharp decline of agricultural output. And if Saudis wake up to the use of drip irrigation and moisture Agriculture techniques in this misty region, they will be able to produce vegetables and herbs for the local population.

Climate
Bisha has a hot desert climate (Köppen climate classification BWh).

See also 
Education:

It has University of Bisha which offers education in a range of professional and non professional courses at graduate levels. The city also has a number of colleges for male and female which are offering graduate courses. Some of them are:

 List of cities and towns in Saudi Arabia

References

External links 
 The Biggest Dam in the Kingdom: Splendid Arabia, An Online Guide to the Kingdom of Saudi Arabia

Populated places in 'Asir Province